Snowdrops from a Curate's Garden is a collection of obscene stories, with accompanying obscene poems. All sorts of sexual scenes are presented, some quite taboo, but the intent is less to sexually titillate the reader than it is to shock his or her sensibilities through extremes of filth. It was the project of the English author and occultist Aleister Crowley, under the pseudonym "George Archibald Bishop", and published in Paris in 1904. His goal was to write the filthiest book possible, and he felt this was spiritually significant.

Poems 
 "The Cocksucker’s Crime; or, the Cunt of the Countess"
 "The Voluptuous Villagers; or, Vice on the Varm"
 "Juggling with Joy-jelly; or, The Ecclesiastic’s Exploit"
 "The Futile Fuck-stick; or, The Distiller’s Dilemma"
 "The Queen’s Quandary; or, Leaves from the Journal of my Life in the Highlands"
 "The King’s Appendix"
 "My Aunt’s Amusement; or, Aching for Arse-plugs"
 "The Frigging Photographers; or, The Secrets of a Sommier"
 "Tupping a Tombstone; or, The Corpse and the Cleric"
 "The Birch and the Bottom; or, A Milliner’s Manners"
 "A Family Fuck"
 "The Casuist’s Collapse; and the Apotheosis of the Archbishop; also, A Punk’s Parturition"

Footnotes

Bibliography
 

1904 poems
Erotic poetry
Thelemite texts
Works by Aleister Crowley
Works published under a pseudonym